Chytridiomycetes is a class of fungi. Members are found in soil, fresh water, and saline estuaries.  They are first known from the Rhynie chert. It has recently  been redefined to exclude the taxa Neocallimastigomycota and Monoblepharidomycetes, which are now a phylum and a sister-class respectively.

Chytridiomycetes is the major class of the phylum Chytridiomycota, which contains a number of parasitic species. At least two species in this class are known to infect a number of amphibian species.

Phylogeny
Based on the work of "The Mycota: A Comprehensive Treatise on Fungi as Experimental Systems for Basic and Applied Research", Powell and Letcher 2015 and Karpov et al. 2014.

References 

Chytridiomycota
Aquatic fungi